A field goal, also called a flying kick or speculator, was a way of scoring in the game of rugby football. It consisted of a player kicking the ball from the ground (not on a kicking tee) without using their hands in open play over the crossbar. This method of scoring was abolished in rugby union in 1905 and in rugby league in 1950.

Rugby union 
During the development of rugby football, the field goal was considered a legitimate way of scoring. In 1845, place kicks were the only way to score a goal. In 1871, it was clarified under Law 6 that kicking the ball through the posts from the ground in open play was a valid method of scoring a goal. A rejected proposal in 1882 by the Rugby Football Union suggested that field goals, referred to as a "flying kick", would be worth 4 points, the same value as a try. It was eventually formalised in 1891 by the International Rugby Football Board that field goals (classed as any other goals) would be worth 4 points. However, in 1905 both the IRFB and Rugby Football Union (RFU) abolished the field goal as a valid method of scoring.

Rugby league 
When the Northern Rugby Football Union broke away from the RFU, both codes' governing bodies retained the field goal. While the RFU abolished the field goal in rugby union in 1905, rugby league retained it. However, there was criticism about it on the 190809 Australia rugby league tour of Britain, whereby the Australia national rugby league team player Dally Messenger continuously and recklessly attempted field goals during a match against the England national rugby league team. A writer for the Daily Chronicle stated: "I do not believe in the speculator at any time, it is bad rugby football", and expressed concern that Dally would either injure himself or others. As predicted, during a later match against St. Helens, he damaged the cartilage in his knee due to repeated attempts at the scoring move.

In 1922, the New South Wales Rugby Football League abolished this type of field goal along with the goal from mark. However the Northern Rugby Football League, considered the guardian of the rules of rugby league at the time, kept the method in the rulebook, not officially abolishing it until 1950. In Australia, the term field goal is used as a synonym for drop goal.

See also

References 

History of rugby union
History of rugby league
Rugby union terminology
Rugby league terminology